Tamika Williams-Jeter (born Tamika Maria Williams; April 12, 1980) is the head women's basketball coach at the University of Dayton.  She was a professional basketball player for the Minnesota Lynx and the Connecticut Sun in the WNBA.

High school
Born in Dayton, Ohio, Williams-Jeter started playing organized basketball at age 10 in the Dayton Lady Hoopstars AAU program, played on Lady Hoopstar teams which won one national AAU age group championship and finished in top four twice.

Williams-Jeter had a stellar basketball career at Chaminade-Julienne, a Catholic high school in Dayton, Ohio. She was named the 1997 and 1998 Ohio Player of the Year and was named in the 1997-98 Associated Press girls Division I All-Ohio high school basketball team. She was named "Ohio's Miss Basketball" by the Associated Press and chosen by a statewide media panel. Williams-Jeter was also named a WBCA All-American and the WBCA high school player of the year. Williams-Jeter participated in the WBCA High School All-America Game, where she scored eight points.

After graduating from Chaminade-Julienne, Williams-Jeter was heavily recruited by numerous collegiate teams. In 1997, she was the subject of a seven-page feature in a January 1998 issue of a Sports Illustrated magazine article on the pressures of being recruited. Ohio State arranged for a private jet to fly Williams-Jeter from her home in Dayton to Columbus, approximately 70 miles away. She mentioned this to UConn coach Geno Auriemma, who responded by mailing her a little wooden plane, explaining, "Sorry, Tamika. This is the best we can do."

College
Williams-Jeter attended the University of Connecticut, majored in interpersonal communications, and served as President of UConn's Student-Athlete Advisory Committee. From 1998 to 2002 she was part of the UConn basketball team, which became NCAA Division I National Championship teams in 2000 and 2002 under coach Geno Auriemma.

She completed her four-year collegiate career in 2002 with averages of 10.6 points per game and 5.8 rebounds per game. She finished as UConn's all-time leader in field goal percentage at 70.3% (560-for-797), which is also an NCAA Division 1 record. She also holds the Huskies' top four single-season marks for field goal percentage, ranked 14th on UConn's all-time scoring list with 1,402 points, and finished 10th all-time in rebounding (763). She was one of four players (along with Asjha Jones, Swin Cash, and Sue Bird) called by Sports Illustrated "best recruiting class of 1998".

In recent years, she has been spending the WNBA off-season working on getting a master's degree in sports management at Ohio State University.

Professional career
During the 2002 WNBA Draft, the Minnesota Lynx selected Williams-Jeter in the first round, sixth overall. In 2003, she set a WNBA single-season record for field-goal accuracy, with a percentage of 66.8%.

On March 14, 2008, Williams-Jeter was traded to the Connecticut Sun in exchange for Kristen Rasmussen.

WNBA career statistics

Regular season

|-
| align="left" | 2002
| align="left" | Minnesota
| 31 || 31 || 33.0 || .561 || .273 || .583 || 7.4 || 1.6 || 1.4|| 0.4 || 2.4 || 10.1
|-
| align="left" | 2003
| align="left" | Minnesota
| 34 || 34 || 33.0 || .668 || .000 || .484 || 6.1 || 1.3 || 1.0 || 0.3 || 1.7 || 8.9
|-
| align="left" | 2004
| align="left" | Minnesota
| 34 || 33 || 28.8 || .540 || .250 || .563 || 6.0 || 1.1 || 1.1 || 0.1 || 1.9 || 7.5
|-
| align="left" | 2005
| align="left" | Minnesota
| 34 || 9 || 22.3 || .551 || .000 || .543 || 5.0 || 1.1 || 0.9 || 0.1 || 1.2 || 5.8
|-
| align="left" | 2006
| align="left" | Minnesota
| 31 || 30 || 21.6 || .442 || .111 || .444 || 5.6 || 0.7 || 0.5 || 0.0 || 1.2 || 4.7
|-
| align="left" | 2007
| align="left" | Minnesota
| 21 || 2 || 7.1 || .600 || .000 || .636 || 1.9 || 0.3 || 0.1 || 0.0 || 0.4 || 1.5
|-
| align="left" | 2008
| align="left" | Connecticut
| 34 || 1 || 11.0 || .417 || .000 || .585 || 2.9 || 0.4 || 0.3 || 0.0 || 0.8 || 2.5
|-
| align="left" | Career
| align="left" | 7 years, 2 teams
| 219 || 140 || 23.2 || .549 || .161 || .543 || 5.1 || 1.0 || 0.8 || 0.1 || 1.4 || 6.1

Playoffs

|-
| align="left" | 2003
| align="left" | Minnesota
| 3 || 3 || 38.7 || .607 || .000 || .667 || 7.3 || 1.0 || 2.3 || 0.3 || 1.3 || 16.7
|-
| align="left" | 2004
| align="left" | Minnesota
| 2 || 2 || 36.0 || .625 || .000 || 1.000 || 8.5 || 3.0 || 0.5 || 0.0 || 0.5 || 12.0
|-
| align="left" | 2008
| align="left" | Connecticut
| 3 || 0 || 9.3 || .500 || .000 || .000 || 2.3 || 0.3 || 0.3 || 0.3 || 0.3 || 1.3
|-
| align="left" | Career
| align="left" | 3 years, 2 teams
| 8 || 5 || 27.0 || .604 || .000 || .714 || 5.8 || 1.3 || 1.1 || 0.3 || 0.8 || 9.8

Coaching career
Williams-Jeter served as an assistant coach at the University of Kansas for their women's basketball team.

Williams-Jeter served as the head coach for the Senior National team of India at the Asian Games held in Guangzhou (China). The games were played in November 2010.

Williams-Jeter joined Matthew Mitchell's Kentucky staff as an assistant coach in August 2014.

Head coach

Wittenberg
In May 2021, Williams-Jeter became head basketball coach at Wittenberg University. In her first year as the head coach of the Tigers, Wittenberg knocked out #10 DePaw out of the NCAC Tournament on February 25, 2022, advancing to the title game.

Dayton
On March 26, 2022, Williams-Jeter was announced as the head coach of the University of Dayton Flyers.

Awards 
 WBCA high school player of the year(1998)
 Ohio Miss Basketball (1998) awarded by Ohio High School Basketball Coaches Association
 2008 Dawn Staley Community Leadership Award, awarded annually to a WNBA player who best exhibits the characteristics of a leader in the community.
 2013 Inductee of the Ohio Basketball Hall of Fame

UConn statistics

See also
 UConn Huskies women's basketball
 List of Connecticut women's basketball players with 1000 points
 List of NCAA Division I women's basketball career field-goal percentage leaders

Notes

References

External links
WNBA Player Profile
Kentucky coaching profile
Sun acquires Tamika Raymond from Minnesota

1980 births
Living people
African-American basketball players
American women's basketball coaches
American women's basketball players
Basketball coaches from Ohio
Basketball players from Dayton, Ohio
Connecticut Sun players
Kansas Jayhawks women's basketball coaches
Kentucky Wildcats women's basketball coaches
Minnesota Lynx draft picks
Minnesota Lynx players
Ohio State Buckeyes women's basketball coaches
Parade High School All-Americans (girls' basketball)
Penn State Lady Lions basketball coaches
Power forwards (basketball)
UConn Huskies women's basketball players
21st-century African-American sportspeople
21st-century African-American women
20th-century African-American people
20th-century African-American women
Dayton Flyers women's basketball coaches